In historical linguistics, the High German consonant shift or second Germanic consonant shift is a phonological development (sound change) that took place in the southern parts of the West Germanic dialect continuum in several phases. It probably began between the third and fifth centuries and was almost complete before the earliest written records in High German were produced in the eighth century. From Proto-Germanic, the resulting language, Old High German, can be neatly contrasted with the other continental West Germanic languages, which for the most part did not experience the shift, and with Old English, which remained completely unaffected.

General description
The High German consonant shift altered a number of consonants in the southern German dialects – which includes Standard German, Yiddish, and Luxembourgish – and so explains why many German words have different consonants from the related words in English, Dutch and the Scandinavian languages. The term is sometimes used to refer to a core group of nine individual consonant modifications. Alternatively, it may encompass other phonological changes that took place in the same period.
For the core group, there are three changes, which may be thought of as three successive phases. Each phase affected three consonants, making nine modifications in total:
The three Germanic voiceless stops became fricatives in certain phonetic environments: English ship , Dutch  , Norwegian   versus German  ;
The same sounds became affricates in other positions: Eng. apple , Du.   , Nor.   versus Ger.  ; and
The three voiced stops became voiceless: Eng. door , Du.  , Nor.   versus Ger.  .

Since phases 1 and 2 affect the same voiceless sounds, some scholars find it more convenient to treat them together, thus making for only a two-phase process: shifts in voiceless  consonants (phases 1–2 of the three-phase model) and in voiced consonants (phase 3). The two-phase model has advantages for typology, but it does not reflect chronology.

Of the other changes that sometimes are bracketed within the High German consonant shift, the most important (sometimes thought of as the fourth phase) is:
4.  (and its allophone ) became  (this). This also affects Dutch (this), and has parallels in Norwegian, Danish, and Swedish, but not Icelandic (this :   /  , but  , respectively).

This phenomenon is known as the High German consonant shift, because the core group affects the High German languages of the mountainous south. It is also known as the "second Germanic" consonant shift to distinguish it from the "(first) Germanic consonant shift" as defined by Grimm's law and its refinement, Verner's law.

The High German consonant shift did not occur in a single movement, but rather as a series of waves over several centuries. The geographical extents of these waves vary.  They all appear in the southernmost dialects, and spread northwards to differing degrees, giving the impression of a series of pulses of varying force emanating from what is now Austria and Switzerland.  Whereas some are found only in the southern parts of Alemannic German (which includes Swiss German) or Bavarian (which includes Austrian), most are found throughout the Upper German area, and some spread on into the Central German dialects.  Indeed, Central German is often defined as the area between the / and the / boundaries, thus between complete shift of Germanic  (Upper German) and complete lack thereof (Low German). The shift   >   was more successful; it spread all the way to the North Sea and affected Dutch as well as German.  Most of these changes have become part of modern Standard German.

The High German consonant shift is a good example of a chain shift, as was its predecessor, the first Germanic consonant shift.

Overview table
The effects of the shift are most obvious for the non-specialist when comparing Modern German lexemes containing shifted consonants with their Modern English or Dutch unshifted equivalents. The following overview table is arranged according to the original Proto-Indo-European (PIE) phonemes. Note that the pairs of words used to illustrate sound shifts are cognates; they need not be semantic equivalents. 

Notes:

Core group

Phase 1
These became geminated (long) fricatives, except in word-final position where they were shortened and merged with the existing single consonants. Geminate plosives in words like  "apple" or  "cat" were not affected, nor were plosives preceded by another consonant like in  "sharp" or  "heart". These remained unshifted until the second phase.

  >  (>  finally)
  >  (>  finally)
  >  (>  finally)

It can be assumed that the two sounds merged early on.

The exact nature of the distinction is unknown; possibly  was apical  while  was laminal  (a similar distinction exists in Basque and formerly in Old Spanish).

It is not quite clear why these exceptions occurred.

Examples:
 Old English  : Old High German  (English sleep , Dutch   : German  )
 OE  : OHG  (English street , Dutch   : German  )
 OE  : OHG  (English rich , Dutch   : German  )

Phase 2
In the second phase, which was completed by the 8th century, the same sounds became affricates in three environments: in word-initial position; when geminated; and after a liquid ( or ) or nasal ( or ).
 >  (also written  in OHG)
 >  (written  or )
 >  (written  in OHG).

Examples:
 OE  : OHG ,  (English apple, Dutch , Low German  : German )
 OE  : OHG ,  (English sharp, Dutch , Low German  : German )
 OE  : OHG  (English cat, Dutch , Low German  : German )
 OE  : OHG  (English tame, Dutch , Low German  : German )
 OE  : OHG  (English lick, Dutch , Low German , German  : High Alemannic , / )
 OE  : OHG ,  (English work, Dutch , Low German , German  : High Alemannic /)

The shift did not take place where the plosive was preceded by a fricative, i.e. in the combinations .  also remained unshifted in the combination .
 OE  : OHG  (English sparrow, Dutch , German )
 OE  : OHG  (English mast, Dutch , Low German , German )
 OE  : OHG  (English night, Dutch , Low German , German )
 OE  : OHG  (English true, Dutch , Low German , German ; the cognates mean "trustworthy","faithful", not "correct","truthful". Although, English true can mean "faithful" as well in some instances, like in a phrase such as "he stayed true to her".)

, . These stems had  in OHG inflected forms.

In Yiddish and some German dialects, this occurred in initial positions, e.g., Dutch : German  : Yiddish   'horse'. In modern standard German, the pronunciation  for word-initial  is also a very common feature of northern and central German accents (i.e. in regions where  does not occur in the native dialects; compare German phonology).

This simplification is also reflected in modern standard German, e.g. 'to throw' ← OHG  ← ,  'to help' ← OHG  ← . Only one standard word with  remains:  'carp' ← OHG .

The shift of   >   occurs throughout the High German area, and is reflected in Modern Standard German.
The shift of   >   occurs throughout Upper German, but there is wide variation in Central German dialects. In West Central German dialects, initial p and the clusters -pp- and -mp- are unaffected by the shift (cf. Luxembourgish  ~ Standard German ); in Ripuarian, the clusters rp and lp also remain unaffected, while in Moselle Franconian and Rhine Franconian, they have become rf and lf (e.g. Ripuarian  ~ Moselle/Rhine Franconian ). In East Central German, the clusters  and  remained untouched. The shift   >   is reflected in standard German, but there are many exceptions to it, i.e. forms adopted with Central or Low German consonantism (etc.). This rareness is partly due to the fact that word-initial  was virtually absent in Proto-Germanic. Note, however, that the Upper German dialects have many more such words and that they have used  productively, which is not the case in standard German.
The shift of   >   is today geographically highly restricted and seen only in the southernmost Upper German dialects. In mediaeval times, it was much more widespread (almost throughout Upper German), but was later "undone" from the north southward. Tyrolese, the Southern Austro-Bavarian dialect of Tyrol, is the only dialect in which the affricate  has been preserved in all positions, e.g. Cimbrian   'not any' (cf. German ). High Alemannic  'to adhere, stick' (cf. German ). Initial  does occur to a certain extent in modern High Alemannic in place of any k in loanwords, e.g. 'Caribbean' (?), and  occurs where  + , e.g. 'laborious work', from the verb .

Phase 3
The third phase, which had the most limited geographical range, saw the voiced plosives become voiceless.
 b > p
 d > t
 g > k
Of these, only the dental shift d > t universally finds its way into standard German (though with relatively many exceptions, partly due to Low and Central German influence). The other two occur in standard German only in original geminates, e.g. ,  vs. Dutch ,  "rib, bridge". For single consonants, b > p and g > k are restricted to High Alemannic German in Switzerland, and south Bavarian dialects in Austria.

This phase has been dated as early as the 4th century, though this is highly debated. According to most scholars, the pre-Old High German runic inscriptions of  show no convincing trace of the consonant shift.

This shift probably began in the 8th or 9th century, after the first and second phases ceased to be productive; otherwise the resulting voiceless plosives would have shifted further to fricatives and affricates.

In those words in which an Indo-European voiceless plosive became voiced as a result of Verner's  law, phase three of the High German shift returns this to its original value (*t  >  d  >  t):
 PIE *
 >  early Proto-Germanic  (t  >  /θ/ by the first Germanic consonant shift)
 >  late Proto-Germanic  (/θ/  >  /ð/ by Verner's law)
 >  West-Germanic * (/ð/  >  d by West Germanic sound change)
 >  Old High German  (d  >  t by the second Germanic consonant shift)

Examples:
 OE  : OHG  (English do, Dutch , Low German , German )
 OE  : OHG  (English mother, Dutch , Low German , German )
 OE  : OHG  (English red, Dutch , Low German , German )

The combination  was shifted to  only in some varieties of OHG. Written OHG normally has shifted  (e.g. "to bind"), but in Middle High German and modern standard German the unshifted pronunciation  prevails (cf. ). In this case,  corresponds to original Proto-Germanic  while * is a later, specifically West Germanic, form, created by analogy with the Verner's law alternant , as in Proto-Germanic  "they found",  "found".)

In other cases, modern  is due to the later loss of a vowel (e.g.  from OHG ) or borrowing (e.g.  from Low German).

Other changes
Other consonant changes on the way from West Germanic to Old High German are included under the heading "High German consonant shift" by some scholars who see the term as a description of the whole context, but are excluded by others who use it to describe the neatness of the threefold chain shift.  Although it might be possible to see   >  ,   >  and   >   as a similar group of three, both the chronology and the differing phonetic conditions under which these changes occur speak against such a grouping.

>   (phase 4)
What is sometimes known as the fourth phase shifted the dental fricatives to plosives. This shift occurred late enough that unshifted forms are to be found in the earliest Old High German texts, and thus it can be dated to the 9th or 10th century. This shift spread much further north than the others, eventually reaching all continental West Germanic languages (hence excluding only English). It is therefore not uniquely High German; it is nonetheless often grouped together with the other shifts, as it did spread from the same area. The shift took several centuries to spread north, appearing in Dutch only during the 12th century, and in Frisian and Low German not for another century or two after that.

The sound  then became , while  became . In Old Frisian, the voiceless fricatives were only voiced medially, and remained voiceless initially except in some pronouns and determiners, much as in Old and Modern English. Thus, modern Frisian varieties have  word-initially in most words, and  medially.

 early OHG   >  classical OHG  (English that, Icelandic  : Dutch , German , West Frisian )
 early OHG   >  classical OHG  (English think : Dutch , German , West Frisian )
 early OHG   >  classical OHG  (English thane : Dutch , German  "warrior", West Frisian )
 early OHG   >  classical OHG  (English thirsty : Dutch , German , West Frisian , Swedish )
 early OHG / >  classical OHG  (English brother, Icelandic  : Dutch , German , West Frisian )
 early OHG   >  classical OHG  (English mouth, Old Norse  : Dutch , German )
 early OHG /  >  classical OHG ,  (English thou, Icelandic  : Low German , German , West Frisian )

In dialects affected by phase 4 but not by the dental variety of phase 3 (Central German, Low German, and Dutch), two Germanic phonemes merged: þ becomes d, but original Germanic d remains unchanged:

The stems with the Upper German development appear to have undergone the High German consonant shift several times, e.g. ("to force") < MHG  < OHG  < Germanic .

In 1955, Otto Höfler suggested that a  change analogous to the fourth phase of the High German consonant shift may have taken place in Gothic (East Germanic) as early as the 3rd century AD, and he hypothesised that it may have spread from Gothic to High German as a result of the Visigothic migrations westward (c. 375–500 AD). This has not found wide acceptance; the modern consensus is that Höfler misinterpreted some sound substitutions of Romanic languages as Germanic, and that East Germanic shows no sign of the second consonant shift.

Most dialects of Norwegian and Swedish show a shift that is much like the one in Frisian, with  >  and  > . This shift reached Swedish only around the 16th century or so, as the Gustav Vasa Bible of 1541 still shows the dental fricatives (spelled ). This shift may be part of the same development as in the West Germanic languages, or it may have occurred independently. Danish – geographically between West Germanic and Swedish/Norwegian areas – would have had to experienced this shift first, before it could have spread further northwards. However, Danish does not form a dialect continuum with the West Germanic languages, and the shift occurred only word-initially in it, while it retains  medially. On the other hand, Danish exhibits widespread lenition phenomena, including shifts from plosives to fricatives and further to approximants word-medially, so it is conceivable that these changes counteracted the earlier hardening of the dental fricatives that had reached Danish from the south (thus initially  > , followed by lenition  > ), but only after these changes had propagated further north to the remaining Scandinavian dialects.

/β/  >  /b/
West Germanic *ƀ (presumably pronounced ), which was an allophone of  used in medial position, shifted to (Upper German) Old High German  between two vowels, and also after .

OE  : OHG ,  (obs. English †lief, Dutch , Low German  : German )
OE  : MHG  (English haven, Dutch , Low German ; for German , see below)
OE  : OHG  (English half, Dutch , Low German  : German )
OE  : OHG ,  (English liver, Dutch , Low German  : German )
OE  : OHG  (English self, Dutch , Low German  : German )
OE  : OHG  (English salve, Dutch , Low German  : German )

In the case of weak verbs such as  'have' (compare Dutch ) and  'live' (Dutch ), the consonant differences have an unrelated origin, being a result of the West Germanic gemination and a subsequent process of levelling.

This shift also is only partly completed in Central German, with Ripuarian and Moselle Franconian retaining a fricative pronunciation. For example: Colognian , Luxembourgish , meaning "he lives".

>  
Thus, it affected High German, Low German, Dutch, Frisian and Old English alike. It did not spread to Old Norse, which retained the original fricative. Because of its much wider spread, it must have occurred very early, during Northwest Germanic times, perhaps around the 2nd century.

English has partially reversed this shift through the change  > , for example in father, mother, gather and together.

>  
This change is believed to be early and complete by the 8th century at the latest.

In Northern Dutch, all instances of initial  have merged with the voiceless  due to the lack of minimal pairs (in dialects that strongly distinguish between the two sounds, word-initial  appears only in loanwords).

 Southern Dutch  , Northern Dutch  : German  , English good 
 Southern Dutch  , Northern Dutch : German   : English yesterday , West Frisian  

The shift is only partly complete in Central German. Ripuarian has  word-initially, e.g. Colognian   "good".

In standard German, fricative  is found in coda position in unstressed  (  "blessed" but feminine  ). One will still very frequently hear fricative  in coda position in other cases as well in standard German as pronounced by people from northern and central Germany. Compare German phonology. This pronunciation reaches as far south as Franconia, thus into Upper German areas.

>   
High German experienced the shift   >   in all positions, and   >   before another consonant in initial position (original  may in fact have been apical , as OHG and MHG distinguish it from the reflex   >  , spelled ⟨z⟩ or ⟨ȥ⟩ and presumed to be laminal ):

 German , script
 German , flask
 German , spin
 German , street
 German , sleep
 German , smith
 German , snow
 German , swan

Likewise  usually became :

 German , perch or bass (Dutch )
 German , cherry (Dutch )

In the cluster , this change was not reflected in spelling and the modern standard pronunciation, which is partly based on Low German accents, uses .

The   >   shift occurred in most West Germanic dialects but notably not in Dutch, which instead had  > , while West Frisian retains  in all positions. The two other changes did not reach any further than Limburgish (eastern dialects only) and some southern dialects of Low German:

Terminal devoicing
Other changes include a general tendency towards terminal devoicing in German and Dutch, and to a far more limited extent in English. However, this change is not High German in origin but is generally thought to have originated in Frankish, as the earliest evidence for the change appears in Old Dutch texts at a time when there was still no sign of devoicing at all in Old High German or Old Saxon. 

Nevertheless, the original voiced consonants are usually represented in modern German and Dutch spelling. This is because related inflected forms, such as the plural  , have the voiced form, since here the plosive is not terminal. As a result of these inflected forms, native speakers remain aware of the underlying voiced phoneme, and spell accordingly. However, in Middle High German, these sounds were spelled differently: singular , plural .

Chronology
Since the High German consonant shift took place before the beginning of writing of Old High German in the 8th century, the dating of the various phases is an uncertain business. Different estimates appear elsewhere, for example Waterman, who asserts that the first three phases occurred fairly close together and were complete in Alemannic territory by 600, taking another two or three centuries to spread north.

Sometimes historical constellations help us; for example, the fact that Attila is called  in German proves that the second phase must have been productive after the Hunnish invasion of the 5th century.  The fact that many Latin loan-words are shifted in German (e.g., Latin   >  German ), while others are not (e.g., Latin   >  German ) allows us to date the sound changes before or after the likely period of borrowing.  However, the most useful source of chronological data is German words cited in Latin texts of the late classical and early medieval period.

Precise dating would in any case be difficult, since each shift may have begun with one word or a group of words in the speech of one locality, and gradually extended by lexical diffusion to all words with the same phonological pattern, and then over a longer period of time spread to wider geographical areas.

However, relative chronology can easily be established by the observation that, for example, t > tz must precede d > t, which in turn must precede þ > d; otherwise words with an original þ could have undergone all three shifts and ended up as tz.  By contrast, as the form  for "give" is attested in Old Bavarian, showing both   >    >   and  >    >  , it follows that   >   and   >   must predate phase 3.

Alternative chronologies have been proposed.  According to a theory by the controversial German linguist Theo Vennemann, the consonant shift occurred much earlier and was already completed in the early 1st century BC. On this basis, he subdivides the Germanic languages into High Germanic and Low Germanic. Few other linguists share this view.

Geographical distribution

Roughly, the changes resulting from phase 1 affected Upper and Central German, as did the dental element of phase 2 (t- > z-). The other elements of phase 2 and all of phase 3 impacted only Upper German, while those changes from phase 4 affected the entire German and Dutch-speaking region (the West Germanic dialect continuum).  The generally accepted boundary between Central and Low German, the – line, is sometimes called the Benrath line, as it passes through the Düsseldorf suburb of Benrath, while the main boundary between Central and Upper German, the – line can be called the Speyer line, as it passes near the town of Speyer, some 200 kilometers further south.

However, a precise description of the geographical extent of the changes is far more complex.  Not only do the individual sound shifts within a phase vary in their distribution (phase 3, for example, partly affects the whole of Upper German and partly only the southernmost dialects within Upper German), but there are even slight variations from word to word in the distribution of the same consonant shift.  For example, the – line lies further north than the – line in western Germany, coincides with it in central Germany, and lies further south at its eastern end, although both demonstrate the same shift /k/ > /x/.

Rhenish fan

The subdivision of West Central German into a series of dialects, according to the differing extent of the phase 1 shifts, is particularly pronounced. It is known as the Rhenish fan because on the map of dialect boundaries, the lines form a fan shape. Here, no fewer than eight isoglosses run roughly West to East and partially merge into a simpler system of boundaries in East Central German. The table on the right lists the isoglosses (bold) and the main resulting dialects (italics), arranged from north to south.

Lombardic
Some of the consonant shifts resulting from the second and third phases appear also to be observable in Lombardic, the early mediaeval Germanic language of Italy, which is preserved in runic fragments of the late 6th and early 7th centuries. However, the Lombardic records are not sufficient to allow a complete taxonomy of the language. It is therefore uncertain whether the language experienced the full shift or merely sporadic reflexes, but b > p is clearly attested. This may mean that the shift began in Italy, or that it spread southwards as well as northwards. Ernst Schwarz and others have suggested that the shift occurred in German as a result of contacts with Lombardic. If, in fact, there is a relationship here, the evidence of Lombardic would force us to conclude that the third phase must have begun by the late 6th century, rather earlier than most estimates, but this would not necessarily require that it had spread to German so early.

If, as some scholars believe, Lombardic was an East Germanic language and not part of the German language dialect continuum, it is possible that parallel shifts took place independently in German and Lombardic. However, extant words in Lombardic show clear relations to the Bavarian language. Therefore, Werner Betz and others prefer to treat Lombardic as an Old High German variety. There were close connections between Lombards and Proto-Bavarians.

According to Jonas of Bobbio (before 650) in Lombardy, when Columbanus came to the Alemanni at Lake Constance shortly after 600, he made  ("barrels", English cup, German ) burst. This shows that in the time of Columban the shift from p to f had occurred neither in Alemannic nor in Lombardic. So it is best to see the consonant shift as a common Lombardic—Bavarian—Alemannic shift between 620 and 640, when these tribes had plenty of contact.

Sample texts

Unshifted forms in modern Standard German 
The High German consonant shift – at least as far as the core group of changes is concerned – is an example of an exceptionless sound change and was frequently cited as such by the Neogrammarians. Modern standard German is a compromise form between East Central German and northern Upper German, mainly based on the former but with the consonant pattern of the latter. However, individual words from all German dialects and varieties have found their way into the standard. When a German word contains unshifted consonants, it is often a loanword from either Low German or, less often, Central German. Either the shifted form has become obsolete, as in:

  "harbor", from Low German (15th century), replacing Middle High German ;
  "lease", from West Central German, replacing Middle High German ;

or the two forms are retained as doublets, as in:

  "coat of arms", from Low German, alongside High German  "weapon";
  "to fight", from either Low German or Central German, alongside High German  "to knock".

Other examples of unshifted words from Low German include:

  "oat" (vs. Swiss, Austrian );  "lip" (vs.  "animal lip");  "water level";  "pimple"

However, the majority of unshifted words in German are loaned from Latin, Romance, English or Slavic:

  "pair, couple" (← Medieval Latin ),  "whip" (← Old Sorbian/Czech ).

Other ostensible irregularities in the sound shift, which we may notice in modern Standard German, are usually clarified by checking the etymology of an individual word. Possible reasons include the following:

 Onomatopoeia (cf. German  ~ English to babble, which were probably formed individually in each language);
 Later developments after the High German sound shift, especially the elimination of some unstressed vowels. For example, Dutch  and German  ("church") seem to indicate an irregular shift -rk-  >  -rch- (compare regular German ). However,  stems from OHG  (Greek  ) with a vowel after  (which makes the shift perfectly regular).
Thereby OHG  became modern  ("thousand"), as if it had been shifted twice. Contrariwise, and more often, the shift was apparently undone in some words: PG  > OHG  > back again to modern  ("vapor, haze"). In this latter case, it is sometimes difficult to determine whether re-voicing was a native Middle High German development or from Low German influence. (Often, both factors have collaborated to establish the voiced variant.)

See also
 Glottalic theory
 Low Dietsch dialects
 The Tuscan , a similar evolution differentiating the Tuscan dialects from Standard Italian.

References

Sources
 
  (revised Elmar Seebold),  (The Etymological Dictionary of the German Language), 24th edition, 2002.
  (Middle High German Grammar), 23rd ed, Tübingen 1989, 114–22.
 , The Consonants of German: Synchrony and Diachrony, Milano, Cisalpino, 1979.
 , Paris, 1997.
 Robert S. P. Beekes, Utrecht, 1990.
 

Indo-European linguistics
History of the German language
Old High German
Sound laws